Delavan Bates (March 17, 1840 – December 19, 1918) was an American soldier who fought in the American Civil War. Bates was awarded the country's highest award for bravery during combat, the Medal of Honor, for his action in Cemetery Hill, Virginia during the Battle of the Crater on 30 July 1864. He was honored with the award on 22 June 1891.

Biography
Bates was born to Alpheus Bates (1808 - 1888) and Hannah Bates (1810 - 1901) on 17 March 1840. Bates enlisted with the 121st New York Infantry in August 1862. He was captured at the Battle of Salem Church during the Battle of Fredericksburg and was held at Libby Prison in Richmond, Virginia for approximately two weeks. He was subsequently released in a prison exchange. He was also involved in the battles of Chancellorsville and Gettysburg.

Bates became colonel of the 30th United States Colored Infantry in March 1864 While leading his troops in the Battle of the Crater on 30 July 1864, he was seriously wounded about his chest and arms, in addition to receiving a bullet in the face. Bates survived these injuries and was among 23 troops to receive the Medal of honor for bravery during the battle. By the end of the war Bates had been promoted to Brevet Brigadier General. He honorably mustered out in December 1865.

After the war Bates resided in Salisbury, North Carolina but soon returned to West Richmondville, New York where he married Lana Ann Green on 2 January 1870, with whom he had five children. He was a merchant and storekeeper.

Bates died in Aurora, Nebraska on December 18, 1918 and his remains are interred at Aurora Cemetery.

Medal of Honor citation

See also

List of American Civil War Medal of Honor recipients: A–F

External links

References

1840 births
1918 deaths
People of New York (state) in the American Civil War
Union Army officers
United States Army Medal of Honor recipients
American Civil War recipients of the Medal of Honor
People from Richmondville, New York
People from Aurora, Nebraska